Artsakh Air, also referred to as Artsakhavia, was an airline scheduled to operate from the airport in Stepanakert in 2017. It had a head office on the grounds of Stepanakert Airport.  It has never started operations. 
The Artsakh Air  fleet consisted of the following aircraft:

See also
 Nagorno-Karabakh Republic § Transportation

References

Airlines of the Republic of Artsakh
Airlines established in 2011